Tōvii (or Toovii) is a high plateau in western Nuku Hiva, French Polynesia, located in the traditional province of Te Ii.  The primary vegetation of the plateau is tall grasses.

Sediment cores from the plateau have been used to study Polynesia's paleoclimate.

References

Landforms of the Marquesas Islands
Plateaus of Oceania